David Steckel (born March 15, 1982)  is an American former professional ice hockey center.  He played in the National Hockey League for the Washington Capitals, the New Jersey Devils, Toronto Maple Leafs and Anaheim Ducks, before finishing his hockey career with the Thomas Sabo Ice Tigers of the Deutsche Eishockey Liga (DEL).  He was known for his faceoff proficiency during his career.

Playing career
Steckel was drafted by the Los Angeles Kings in the first round, 30th overall, in the 2001 NHL Entry Draft. Steckel played one full season with the US Junior National Team in the United States Hockey League before entering Ohio State University.  He played four seasons with the Buckeyes hockey team, and then joined the American Hockey League's Manchester Monarchs for the 2004–05 season.

Steckel, a free agent, then signed with the Washington Capitals August 25, 2005, on the recommendation of Bruce Boudreau. He made his NHL debut with the Washington Capitals in the 2005–06 season, appearing in seven games.  After appearing in five more games with the Capitals in 2006–07, he made the team's opening night roster in 2007–08.

Steckel proved himself to be a valuable commodity to the Capitals.  He often centered the third line and was called on as a key member of the penalty kill.  Steckel also proved himself very effective at face-offs, and typically was placed on the ice to take face-offs during critical moments of games.  Near the end of the season, Steckel broke his finger blocking a shot and had to have pins put in.  However, he missed very few games and was back on the ice during the playoffs.

Steckel's size and grit served the Capitals well, and it was expected that he would have an expanded role in the 2008–09 season. In the 2008–09 season Steckel was once again one of the Capitals top face-off men and one of their top penalty killers. He was 2nd on the team in shorthanded time-on-ice per game (first among forwards) with 3:48.  On face-offs, he finished the season 5th in the NHL, winning 57.9% of his draws.  He scored 8 goals and had 11 assists during the regular season.  In the 2nd round of the 2009 playoff series against the Pittsburgh Penguins he scored his first-ever playoff game-winning goal in overtime of Game 6 to force a Game 7.

During the 2011 NHL Winter Classic on January 1, 2011, Steckel collided with Pittsburgh's Sidney Crosby on a blindside hit while skating out of his own zone to rejoin the play. Crosby experienced mild concussion symptoms and neck pain but remained in the game. A subsequent hit from Tampa Bay's Victor Hedman left Crosby with severe concussion symptoms and he did not return for the rest of the regular season, the 2010–11 Stanley Cup Playoffs, or the first twenty games of the 2011–12 NHL season. Hedman later said that he believed it was the collision with Steckel which had caused Crosby's severe concussion, and many observers concurred.

On February 28, 2011, Steckel along with Washington's 2012 2nd round pick was traded from the Capitals to the New Jersey Devils in exchange for Jason Arnott.

On October 4, 2011, Steckel was acquired by the Toronto Maple Leafs in exchange for a fourth round pick in 2012. In his only full season with the Maple Leafs, he contributed to the Leafs fourth line to match his career-high 8 goals for 13 points in 76 games.

During the 2012–13 season, Steckel was demoted to a reserve role. He sparingly appeared in 13 games before being traded on March 15, 2013, to the Anaheim Ducks in exchange for Ryan Lasch and a seventh-round pick in the 2014 draft.  The trade reunited Steckel with former coach Bruce Boudreau. Steckel was re-signed by the Ducks for one more year on November 11, 2013. On December 12, 2013, the Ducks assigned Steckel to the Norfolk Admirals of the AHL.

On July 28, 2015, as a free agent, Steckel opted to sign his first contract abroad, agreeing to a one-year deal with German club, Thomas Sabo Ice Tigers of the DEL.

Personal life
Following retirement, Steckel is currently tearing up Columbus Adult League, level C.

Career statistics

Regular season and playoffs

International

Awards and honors

References

External links

1982 births
American men's ice hockey centers
Anaheim Ducks players
Hershey Bears players
Ice hockey players from Wisconsin
Iowa Wild players
Living people
Los Angeles Kings draft picks
Manchester Monarchs (AHL) players
National Hockey League first-round draft picks
New Jersey Devils players
Norfolk Admirals players
Ohio State Buckeyes men's ice hockey players
Reading Royals players
Sportspeople from Milwaukee
Thomas Sabo Ice Tigers players
Toronto Maple Leafs players
Washington Capitals players
People from West Bend, Wisconsin